North Hall, University of Wisconsin was the first structure on the University of Wisconsin campus. Located on Bascom Hill, it was built in 1851 at a cost of $19,000. John Muir resided in North Hall when he was a student at the university from 1860 to 1863.  It currently houses the offices of the political science faculty at the university. Muir knoll, across the street, was home to the first American university ski tournament in 1920.

Architecture
North Hall was opened at the University of Wisconsin on September 17, 1851, as the North Dormitory. The sandstone building, which cost $19,000, was typical to educational buildings of the era. The four-story building is rectangular, has a hipped roof, and features little decoration. The east and west facades have ten bays; the center four project slightly beyond the other six. Single-door entrances are found on these facades near the ends. A plain yet deep cornice decorates the roofline. Windows and doors have plain lintel blocks and eight interior chimneys protrude from the roof.

As the initial design was as a dormitory, the building was originally divided into twenty-four suites with a study room and one or two bedrooms. Classrooms were built on the fourth floor. In 1884, a fire destroyed Science Hall, which housed many of the classes on campus, so North Hall was re-purposed to hold classes and offices on all floors. The exterior has retained its original appearance. The interior has been largely remodeled, although original staircases are in place and some rooms maintain their original arrangements.

History
The original developmental plan for North Hall was produced in 1850 by Chancellor John Lathrop and illustrated by architect John F. Rague. It was declared a National Historic Landmark in 1965.

References

External links 

North Hall in The Buildings of the University of Wisconsin

National Historic Landmarks in Wisconsin
Buildings and structures in Madison, Wisconsin
School buildings completed in 1851
University of Wisconsin–Madison
University and college buildings on the National Register of Historic Places in Wisconsin
1851 establishments in Wisconsin
National Register of Historic Places in Madison, Wisconsin
Historic district contributing properties in Wisconsin